Leonard Harrison was a businessman.

Leonard or Len(ny) Harrison may also refer to:
Leonard Harrison State Park
Leonard Harrison (RAF officer)
Len Harrison, co-inventor of Flight data recorder
Lenny Harrison of WMEE

See also